Vishnu Govind Jog, better known as V. G. Jog (22 February 1922 – 31 January 2004), was an Indian violinist. He was the foremost exponent of the violin in the Hindustani music tradition in the 20th century, and is credited for introducing this instrument into Hindustani music.

Early life
Born in Mumbai in 1922, he received his early training from S. C. Athavale and the late Ganpat Rao Purohit. At a very young age, he rubbed shoulders with all-time greats at the Bhatkhande College of Music, Lucknow, in the 1930s — the first great attempt at institutionalising traditional music instruction. Jog began his training at the age of twelve and was subsequently trained by some of the finest musicians of India, like Ustad Allauddin Khan and Pandit S. N. Ratanjankar. Sri Lanka's Pandith W.D. Amaradeva studied under Jog.

Career
Jog earned a master's degree in music from Bhatkhande Music Institute in Lucknow in 1944 and went on to teach there. He also taught at the Ali Akbar College of Music. He was a disciple of Baba Allauddin Khan. He performed and recorded with many of the greatest Hindustani musicians of the 20th century (including Bismillah Khan) and toured the world. He frequently performed for All India Radio's Calcutta division.

His book 'Behala Shiksha', published in 1944, is recognized as a major piece of authoritative literature on the subject. He joined All India Radio in 1953 and served as music producer. He had made successful tours to foreign countries and issued many LP and EP gramophone records of both solo performances and jugalbandi with sangeet maestros. He toured extensively both in India and abroad, significantly in East Africa, Nepal, Sri Lanka, United Kingdom, France, the United States, and West Germany. In 1985, he performed to great acclaim under the auspices of the Festival of India in the United States

He received many honors from various cultural institutions, including the Padma Bhushan in 1983 by the president of India Sangeet Natak Academy award in 1980. By the time he retired he had risen to deputy chief producer, All India Radio.

Style
Trained in the Gwalior, Agra and Bakhale gharanas, Jog evolved his own characteristic style, which was a blend of gayaki and gatkari, noted for purity of melody and tradition, a formidable layakari ability, dignity, crispness and easy musical communication. He often enlightened audiences according to their taste with lighter themes and folk tunes, flowing with lilting and sparkling grace. His virtuosity, mastery of ragas and uncanny realisation of space and time in the construction and knowledge of rhythm are his hallmarks.

Jog, whose name is almost synonymous with the violin in Hindustani classical music, was a performer with the unique distinction of having occupied the top rungs of the classical musicians' hierarchy with three consecutive generations of performers. His career as a highly active and successful performer spanned almost five decades. An unassuming person of infinite charm, he was also regarded as an incomparable accompanist. His duets with Ustad Bismillah Khan met with spectacular successes in India and abroad. He had a remarkable ability to sense the pulse and mood of his audiences.

Personal life
Beginning in 1999, he suffered from Parkinson's disease, and also suffered from respiratory problems in his later years. After prolonged illness Pandit Jog died on 31 Jan 2004 in South Calcutta. 
Every year on the 31 January a concert is held in Kolkata by Swarsadhana, an organisation founded in his memory by his disciple Pt.Pallab Bandyopadhyay.

Awards and honours 

 The Padma Bhushan,
Sangeet Natak Akademi Award,
Rajya Natak Award by West Bengal Government,
Kalidas Samman,
Bhuwalka Puraskar,
Hafiz Ali Khan award.
and numerous other.

References

External links
V. G. Jog obituary
V. G. Jog obituary from The Times of India
V. G. Jog obituary from The Hindu

1922 births
2004 deaths
Neurological disease deaths in India
Deaths from Parkinson's disease
Hindustani instrumentalists
Hindustani violinists
Indian violinists
Recipients of the Padma Bhushan in arts
Recipients of the Sangeet Natak Akademi Award
Musicians from Mumbai
20th-century violinists
20th-century Indian musicians
Musicians from Kolkata